''''''''''''''North Callaway High School''' is a public high school in Kingdom City, Missouri.

Students 

There are 91 freshmen, 87 sophomore, 100 junior, and 80 senior students (2021-2022).

References

External links

North Callaway R-1 School District website

Public high schools in Missouri
Schools in Callaway County, Missouri